The 2020 Atlantic 10 Conference baseball tournament was scheduled to take place from May 20 to 23, 2020. The top seven regular season finishers of the league's twelve teams were to meet in the double-elimination tournament to be held at The Diamond, the home field of VCU in Richmond, Virginia. The winner was to earn the conference's automatic bid to the 2020 NCAA Division I baseball tournament.

On March 12, 2020, the tournament was cancelled due to the coronavirus pandemic.

References

Tournament
Atlantic 10 Conference Baseball Tournament
Atlantic 10 Conference baseball tournament
Atlantic 10 Conference baseball tournament
Atlantic 10 Conference baseball tournament
Baseball in Virginia
College sports in Virginia
Sports in Richmond, Virginia
Sports competitions in Virginia
Tourist attractions in Richmond, Virginia